Bulbophyllum lakatoense is a species of orchid in the genus Bulbophyllum. The species is native to Madagascar.

References
The Bulbophyllum-Checklist
The Internet Orchid Species Photo Encyclopedia

lakatoense